The Royal Order of the Crown was a Prussian order of chivalry. Instituted in 1861 as an honour equal in rank to the Order of the Red Eagle, membership could only be conferred upon commissioned officers (or civilians of approximately equivalent status), but there was a medal associated with the order which could be earned by non-commissioned officers and enlisted men.

Officially the Order of the Red Eagle and the Order of the Crown were equal. Most officials did however prefer to be appointed in the older Order of the Red Eagle. The Order of the Crown was often used as an award for someone who had to be rewarded while the Prussian government did not want to use the Order of the Red Eagle.

Classes
The Order had six classes:
Grand Cross – wore the Grand Cross badge on a sash on the right shoulder, plus the star on the left chest;
1st Class – wore the badge on a sash on the right shoulder, plus the star on the left chest;
2nd Class – wore the badge on a necklet, plus the star on the left chest;
3rd Class – wore the badge on a ribbon on the left chest;
4th Class – wore the badge on a ribbon on the left chest;
Medal – wore the medal on a ribbon on the left chest.

Insignia
The badge of the Order for the 1st to 4th classes was a gilt cross pattée, with white enamel (except for the 4th Class, which was plain). The obverse gilt central disc bore the crown of Prussia, surrounded by a blue enamel ring bearing the motto of the German Empire Gott Mit Uns (God With Us). The reverse gilt disc has the Prussian royal monogram, surrounded by a blue enamel ring with the date 18 October 1861.

The star of the Order was (for Grand Cross) a gilt eight-pointed star, (for 1st Class) a silver eight-pointed star, or (for 2nd Class) a silver four-pointed star, all with straight rays. The gilt central disc again bore the crown of Prussia, surrounded by a blue enamel ring bearing the motto Gott Mit Uns.

The ribbon of the Order was blue.

The insignias of the order could be awarded in dozens of variations. For example with superimposed Cross of Geneva (Red Cross – normally given to doctors for meritorious service), with swords and with oak leaves.

List of Knights
The following lists show a fair cross section of individuals who were known to be conferred membership of the Order in its several classes, in order of precedence. (The following is only a partial list and may expand over time, with further research.)
 Adolf von Deines 3rd Class, 19 September 1883
 Sir Christopher George Francis Maurice Cradock
 Sofanor Parra, Chilean officer who was sent to Germany in 1900 as a military attaché. He obtained the Royal Star of the Order of the Crown.
 Mustafa Kemal Atatürk – 1st Class.
 Count Léo d'Ursel
 Count Charles John d'Oultremont, Knight Grand Cross.
 Ernst von Bibra – 3rd Class 1869
 Gen. Flaviano Paliza – 2nd Class 1899
 Robert James Lindsay VC KCB, 1st and last Baron Wantage of Lockinge – 3rd Class with Cross of Geneva (Following Franco-Prussian War awarded for work with British National Society for Aid to the Sick and Wounded in War)
 Friedrich Wilhelm von Lindeiner-Wildau – 4th Class with Swords
 Eugen Landau – 3rd Class 1899
 Victor Spencer, Baron Churchill – 1st class, 1899 – in connection with the visit of Emperor Wilhelm II to the United Kingdom.
 Major-General Sir John McNeill – 1st class, 1899 – in connection with the visit of Emperor Wilhelm II to the United Kingdom.
 Sir James Reid, 1st Baronet – 2nd class 1901
 Lieutenant-Colonel Sir James Grierson, British Military Attaché at Berlin – 1st class 1901 (previously 2nd class in 1899 in connection with the visit of Emperor Wilhelm II to the United Kingdom)
 Sir William Carington, Comptroller and Treasurer to the Prince of Wales – 2nd class, with star, January 1902 – during the visit to Berlin of the Prince for the birthday of Emperor Wilhelm II
 Sir Charles Cust, Equerry to the Prince of Wales – 2nd class, January 1902 – during the visit to Berlin of the Prince for the birthday of Emperor Wilhelm II
 Lieutenant-Colonel James Robert Johnstone – 2nd class, May 1902 – in recognition of his services in China during the Boxer Rebellion.
 Major-General Sir Ian Hamilton, British Military Secretary – invested 1st class in September 1902 – when he visited Prussia for German Army maneuvers.
Oswald Freiherr von Richthofen, Secretary of Foreign Affairs, 1st class, December 1902
 Maharaja Jagatjit Singh of Kapurthala – 1st class, 1911
 Doctor William H. Welch – 1911
 General Leutnant Friedrich Fahnert 4th class with Swords, German General of Luftwaffe Signals.

References 

Crown (Prussia), Order of the
Kingdom of Prussia
Awards established in 1861
1861 establishments in Prussia